Luan Qerimi (15 October 1929 – 2 December 2018) was an Albanian actor.  He was known for his work in theater, and has performed in plays by William Shakespeare (Othello, Hamlet) and Bertold Brecht (The Resistible Rise of Arturo Ui) in addition to works by Albanian dramatists such as Kolë Jakova and Ekrem Kryeziu.

Biography 
He also made a few films, and worked with Albanian directors such as Dhimitër Anagnosti.  In 1989 Qerimi was named an Artist of Merit by the government of Albania.

References

External links 

1929 births
2018 deaths
Albanian male stage actors
Albanian male film actors
Merited Artists of Albania
20th-century Albanian male actors
People from Lushnjë